Adoration of the Shepherds is a 1539-1540 oil on poplar panel painting by Bronzino, now in the Museum of Fine Arts in Budapest, Hungary.

References

1539 paintings
1540 paintings
Paintings in the collection of the Museum of Fine Arts (Budapest)
Bronzino
Paintings by Bronzino